Great Waltham — also known as Church End — is a village and civil parish in the Chelmsford district, in the county of Essex.

The parish contains the village of Ford End, and the hamlets of Broad's Green, Howe Street, Littley Green, North End and Fanner's Green, and the hamlet of Breeds, part of Great Waltham village. Walthambury Brook, a tributary of the River Chelmer, flows west to east through the parish and at the north of the village.

It is twinned with the French town of Ceyrat.

Landmarks
There were Roman settlements in the area. The Church of St Mary and St Lawrence is of Norman or earlier origin and is constructed of flint and stone. There is an Elizabethan guildhall, also known as Badynghams, and a Grade I listed house called Langley's.

Amenities
The village has a primary school, a post office, two churches and a few pubs. It had a bakery, a garage and a small fire station but they closed down in the late 1900s. The village of Little Waltham is about one mile away.

Location grid

See also
 The Hundred Parishes

References

External links 
 Listed buildings in Great Waltham

 
Villages in Essex
Civil parishes in Essex
City of Chelmsford